Alternative Airplay is a record chart published by the music industry magazine Billboard that ranks the most-played songs on American modern rock radio stations. It was introduced by Billboard in September 1988. During the 2000s, the chart was based on electronically-monitored airplay data compiled by Nielsen Broadcast Data Systems from a panel of national rock radio stations, with songs being ranked by their total number of spins per week. The chart was known as Modern Rock Tracks until June 2009, when it was renamed Alternative Songs in order to "better [reflect] the descriptor used among those in the [modern rock radio] format."

106 songs topped the chart in the 2000s; the first was "All the Small Things" by Blink-182, while the last was "Uprising" by Muse. "The Pretender" by Foo Fighters spent eighteen weeks atop the chart in 2007—the most for any song during the decade—and broke the previous all-time record for most weeks at number one set by "Scar Tissue" by Red Hot Chili Peppers in 1999 and later tied by "It's Been Awhile" by Staind in 2001 and "Boulevard of Broken Dreams" by Green Day in 2005.

The top song of the 2000s on Billboards Alternative Songs decade-end list was "Headstrong" by Trapt, which topped the chart for three weeks and was also its year-end number-one song for 2003. The decade-end top Alternative Songs artist was Linkin Park, who scored eight number-one songs—"In the End", "Somewhere I Belong", "Faint", "Numb", "Lying from You", "Breaking the Habit", "What I've Done" and "New Divide"—and spent a record sixty-two weeks atop the chart during the 2000s.

Number-one songs
Key
 – Billboard year-end number-one song
 – Billboard decade-end number-one song
↑ – Return of a song to number one

References

Bibliography

External links
 Alternative Airplay at Billboard

2000s
United States alternative songs